The 1941 Auburn Tigers football team was an American football team that represented Auburn University in Southeastern Conference (SEC) during the 1941 college football season. In their eighth season under head coach Jack Meagher, the Tigers compiled a record of four wins, five losses and one tie (4–5–1 overall, 0–4–1 in the SEC), finished in last place in the SEC, and outscored opponents by a total of 123 to 115.

Key players on the 1941 Auburn team included quarterback William Eugene Barrineau, halfback Monk Gafford, and tackle J. H. McClurkin. Cheatham was selected by the United Press as the first-team quarterback on the 1941 All-SEC football team. Gafford was selected by the International News Service as a first-team halfback on the 1942 All-America team.

The team divided its home games between Auburn Stadium in Auburn, Alabama, Legion Field in Birmingham, Alabama, and Cramton Bowl in Montgomery, Alabama.

Schedule

Source: 1941 Auburn football schedule

References

Auburn
Auburn Tigers football seasons
Auburn Tigers football